The Division of Menzies is an Australian Electoral Division in the state of Victoria.

History

The Division was proclaimed at the redistribution of 14 September 1984, and was first contested at the 1984 election. The division replaced the eastern half of the abolished Division of Diamond Valley, with the western half becoming the Division of Jagajaga. The division was named after Sir Robert Menzies, the longest serving Prime Minister of Australia.

The Division had always been a safe Liberal seat until the 2022 Australian federal election. It was first held by Neil Brown, a former minister who served in the Fraser Government and who also served as deputy Liberal leader under John Howard from 1985 to 1987. Brown retired in 1991 and was replaced by Kevin Andrews, who held the seat from 1991 to 2022. Andrews was the Father of the House, with the longest continuous tenure of any then current MHR—although Warren Snowdon and Russell Broadbent were first elected earlier.

Boundaries
Since 1984, federal electoral division boundaries in Australia have been determined at redistributions by a redistribution committee appointed by the Australian Electoral Commission. Redistributions occur for the boundaries of divisions in a particular state, and they occur every seven years, or sooner if a state's representation entitlement changes or when divisions of a state are malapportioned.

The division is located in the north-eastern suburbs of Melbourne. It is bordered by Koonung Creek to the south, and until redistribution in 2018 was also bordered by the Yarra River to the north. It covers the suburbs of Bulleen, Croydon Hills, Doncaster, Doncaster East, Donvale, Park Orchards, Templestowe, Templestowe Lower, North Warrandyte, Warrandyte and Warrandyte South. Additionally, parts of Box Hill, Blackburn, Mitcham, Ringwood North, Warranwood, Wonga Park and Eltham fall under the Division.

Members

Election results

References

External links
 Division of Menzies - Australian Electoral Commission

Electoral divisions of Australia
Constituencies established in 1984
1984 establishments in Australia
City of Manningham
City of Maroondah
City of Whitehorse
Electoral districts and divisions of Greater Melbourne